Marilyn McCoo (born September 30, 1943) is an American singer, actress, and television presenter, who is best known for being the lead female vocalist in the group the 5th Dimension, as well as hosting the 1980s music countdown series Solid Gold.

Since 1969, McCoo has been married to singer Billy Davis Jr., the founder and co-member of the 5th Dimension. She has a three-octave vocal range.

Life and career

Early years
Marilyn McCoo was born in Jersey City, New Jersey, United States, to Waymon and Mary McCoo, who were both physicians. Her grandfather was doctor Thomas Vivian McCoo of Eufaula, Alabama. She is African American. She spent her first seven years in Columbus, Georgia. At the age of seven, she moved with her parents, two sisters, and brother to Los Angeles, where she began singing, piano and dance lessons. At the age of 15, she made her television debut on Art Linkletter's Talent Show and began modelling. After graduating from Susan Miller Dorsey High School, she enrolled in UCLA, where she earned a degree in business administration. In 1962, McCoo entered the Miss Bronze California beauty pageant where she won "Miss Grand Talent".

Music career
In the early and mid-1960s, McCoo was a member of the Hi-Fi's, who often opened for Ray Charles. She had been invited to join the group by photographer Lamonte McLemore, who would himself join McCoo in the 5th Dimension. Other Hi-Fi members included Harry Elston and Floyd Butler, who later formed the Friends of Distinction. She met Billy Davis Jr. in 1966 when he established the 5th Dimension, then called the Versatiles, which also included Ron Townson and Florence LaRue. The group's first big hit was with 1967's "Up, Up and Away", written by Jimmy Webb. The song won four 1968 Grammy Awards and was the title track to 5th Dimension's first hit LP. A year later, the group recorded Laura Nyro's "Stoned Soul Picnic". A medley of "Aquarius/Let the Sunshine In" (from the musical Hair) reached No. 1 on the Billboard Hot 100 chart in April to May 1969 and won the Grammy for 'Record of the Year'. The group's recording of another Nyro composition, "Wedding Bell Blues", featuring McCoo's most prominent vocal of that period, topped the Hot 100 in November 1969.

By the early 1970s, McCoo began to sing lead on the group's remaining chart-topping singles, "One Less Bell to Answer", "(Last Night) I Didn't Get to Sleep at All", and "If I Could Reach You".

In 1975, McCoo and Davis left the 5th Dimension and began performing as a duo. Landing a contract with ABC Records, they recorded their 1976 debut album, I Hope We Get to Love in Time. The first single was the title track, which was a mid-chart hit. Their follow up, "You Don't Have to Be a Star (To Be in My Show)" was an even bigger hit, reaching No. 1 on the Billboard Hot 100 in January 1977. McCoo and Davis were awarded a gold single and a gold album as well as a Grammy Award for Best R&B Performance by a Duo or Group with Vocals. The song peaked at number 21 in Australia. They became the first African American married couple to host a network television series, The Marilyn McCoo & Billy Davis Jr. Show, on CBS in summer 1977. They released one more album on ABC in 1978, produced by Frank Wilson and containing the popular ballad "My Reason To Be" by songwriters Judy Wieder and John Footman. The pair signed with CBS Records the following year and released their last album as a duo until October 2008 when the pair released The Many Faces of Love, a collection of hit songs from the 1960s and 1970s.

She was the first to record "Saving All My Love for You" in 1978, later sung by Whitney Houston.The album Marilyn and Billy featured that track as well as a disco hit, "Shine On Silver Moon".

The pair decided to go solo professionally in the early 1980s with McCoo hosting the popular American syndicated television series Solid Gold from 1981 through 1984 and again from 1986 through 1988. She also created a successful nightclub and concert act, and went on to appear as Tamara Price on Days of Our Lives in 1986, as a friend of Marlena Evans who sang at her wedding. Price later became involved with James Reynolds' character Abe Carver. McCoo left the series in 1987.

Her 1991 album, The Me Nobody Knows, was nominated for a Grammy. She also released a Christmas album in 1996. McCoo won her eighth Grammy for her contributions to Quincy Jones' Handel's Messiah.

In 2021, McCoo and Davis released Blackbird Lennon-McCartney Icons, their first studio album in over 30 years. Entrepreneur Kathy Ireland released the album through her record label EE1. The duo said it was a civil rights movement which became a human rights movement with a goal to encourage people to come together during trying times. During an interview about the album on June 29, 2021, Questlove called McCoo and Davis "the first couple of Pop and Soul". They would later appear in Quest's directorial debut, Summer of Soul.

Acting career

McCoo has acted in a number of movies, including Grizzly Adams and the Legend of Dark Mountain (1999), My Mom's a Werewolf (1989) and several television movies, often playing herself. She has appeared on stage in productions of Anything Goes, A...My Name is Alice, Man of La Mancha, and the Broadway production of Show Boat in 1995 through 1996. McCoo appeared together with Davis on The Jamie Foxx Show as Fancy's parents, the Monroes. McCoo also guest-starred on a Canadian game show in the 1990s, called Acting Crazy.

Personal life
McCoo is married to fellow 5th Dimension bandmate Billy Davis Jr. On July 26, 2019, they celebrated their 50th wedding anniversary. The couple shared their story of love and faith in the 2004 book, Up, Up and Away. They continue to perform together in venues around the country. McCoo is a member of Sigma Gamma Rho sorority. She is an emerita member of the board of directors of the Los Angeles Mission. McCoo and Davis are born-again Christians.

Selected filmography

Features
 My Mom's a Werewolf (1989)
 Grizzly Adams and the Legend of Dark Mountain (1999)
 Summer of Soul (2021)

Television
It Takes a Thief (1 episode, 1970)
The Love Boat (1 episode, 1978)
Solid Gold (host, 1981–1984, 1986–1988)
The Fantastic World of D.C. Collins (1984)
New Love, American Style (1 episode, 1986)
The Fall Guy (1 episode, 1986)
Days of Our Lives (1986–1987, 2019–2020)
Punky Brewster (1 episode, 1988)
Night Court (1 episode, 1990)
The Kingdom Chums Original Top Ten (voice, 1990)
The New Adventures of Captain Planet (voice, 2 episodes, 1993)
Women of the House (1 episode, 1995)
The Jamie Foxx Show (2 episodes, 1999–2001)

References

External links

1943 births
Living people
Musicians from Columbus, Georgia
American women pop singers
Grammy Award winners
African-American Christians
Los Angeles High School alumni
Singers from Georgia (U.S. state)
20th-century African-American women singers
21st-century African-American women singers
The Raelettes members
African-American actresses
African-American television hosts